Maxwell Raison (7 November 1901 – 26 July 1988) was an English cricketer.  Raison was a right-handed batsman who bowled right-arm medium pace.  He was born at Wanstead, Essex and educated at Forest School, Walthamstow.

Raison made his first-class debut for Essex against Oxford University in 1928.  He made sixteen further first-class appearances, the last of which came against Yorkshire in the 1930 County Championship.  In his seventeen first-class appearances for Essex, he scored 451 runs at an average of 18.04, with a high score of 57.  This score, which was his only first-class fifty, came against Hampshire in 1928.  With the ball, he took 14 wickets at a bowling average of 41.07, with best figures of 5/104.  These figures, which were his only first-class five wicket haul, came against Gloucestershire in 1928, including the wicket of Wally Hammond who had scored 244 runs.

He was publisher and managing editor of Picture Post. He was also co-founder of New Scientist magazine.

He died at Theberton, Suffolk on 26 July 1988, leaving five sons, one of whom was Timothy Raison. His grandchildren include the actress Miranda Raison and the art historian Paul Raison.

References

External links
Max Raison at ESPNcricinfo
Max Raison at CricketArchive

1901 births
1988 deaths
Free Foresters cricketers 
People from Wanstead
People educated at Forest School, Walthamstow
English cricketers
Essex cricketers